The Democratic Alliance (Greek language: Δημοκρατική Συμμαχία — ΔΗ.ΣΥ., Dimokratiki Symmachia — DISY) was a centrist neoliberal political party in Greece. It was founded on 21 November 2010 by Dora Bakoyannis, a few months after she was expelled from the centre-right party New Democracy for voting in support of a European Union-International Monetary Fund backed financial stability loan. The party's founding congress took place on 27 May 2011.

On 21 May 2012 the party rejoined New Democracy.

Representation
The party had one MEP in the European Parliament (defected from ND):
Theodoros Skylakakis

Political positions
As outlined in its founding declaration, the Democratic Alliance defines itself politically as a centrist movement that is ideologically inspired by the anthropocentric values of humanism, the rational thought and personal freedom brought forth by the Enlightenment, as well as the economic, political and social freedom of liberalism as an underpinning for social justice. It is also influenced by the 19th and 20th century struggles for social solidarity in Europe. Some of the positions advocated by the party are:
A drastic reduction in taxation, by instituting a 20% flat tax. This tax rate would not apply to people with really low incomes, as it would be complemented by a system that replaces the currently existing tax cuts with negative taxation.
A reduction in the number of civil servants and the abolition of tenure, for those hired from now on, that would allow the government to function with 2/3 of its current workforce. This would be coupled with increased salaries, for those that remain, that would be pinned on performance evaluations.
A law that would force trade union leaders themselves to work.
Introducing the requirement of secret ballot voting for all decisions of strike action.
Introducing a coupon-based system of education.

Electoral results

Parliament

References

External links
Democratic Alliance's website

Liberal parties in Greece
Political parties established in 2010
2010 establishments in Greece
Centrist parties in Greece